Giuseppe Vìner (18 October 1875 - 5 October 1925) was an Italian painter, active in depicting rural country landscapes in the style of the Macchiaioli and later in Divisionism.

Biography
He was born in Seravezza, province of Lucca, in present Tuscany. His main work is a triptych called Terra Madre, now split between the Galleria d'Arte Moderna in Florence, a museum of Budapest, and a private collection in Düsseldorf. He committed suicide in his home in Castelverde in Versilia.

References

19th-century Italian painters
Italian male painters
20th-century Italian painters
20th-century Italian male artists
Painters from Lucca
Divisionist painters
1875 births
1925 deaths
1925 suicides
Suicides in Italy
19th-century Italian male artists